Masters of True Crime: Chilling Stories of Murder and the Macabre is a true crime anthology edited by American crime writer R. Barri Flowers. It was released by Prometheus Books in July 2012.

Details
The book includes 17 true-crime short stories by what True Crime Zine called "some of the best authors of the genre." Contributing authors include: Burl Barer, Carol Anne Davis, Phyllis Gobbell, Laura James, Douglas E. Jones, Camille Kimball, Amanda Lamb, Lee Lofland, Michele McPhee, Katherine Ramsland, Linda Rosencrance, Harold Schechter, Cathy Scott, Robert Scott, Patricia Springer, and Ronald J. Watkins. Flowers also contributed a chapter to the anthology, about murders committed in the 1970s by former MSU graduate student Donald Miller, the university's only known serial killer.

Reception
In fall 2012, upon the book's release, Michigan State University's alumni magazine profiled the editor, a graduate of MSU. Masters of True Crime was included in BookTalk.org's Featured Book Suggestions list.

The Big Thrill magazine in July 2012 interviewed the editor and reviewed the book. Crime Magazine included it in its September 2012 "Book ‘Em Vol. 36" issue.

In November 2012, San Francisco Book Review wrote, "In this book, attorneys, reporters, professors, cops, and true crime writers describe exploding bombs, missing persons, cold cases, domestic homicides, organized crime, escaped convicts, kids gone wrong, a dead Girl Scout, and even a psychopathic Russian Countess."

References

External links
Prometheus Books' book page
Portland Book Review
Amazon book page
MSU Alumni Buzz – R. Barri Flowers: Master of True Crime

American non-fiction books
Non-fiction crime books
2012 non-fiction books
Prometheus Books books